WPrime is a computer program that calculates a set number of square roots using Newton's method for estimating functions verifying the results by squaring them then comparing them with the original numbers.

Significance 
WPrime is popular in the overclocking community for testing the performance and stability of computer processors, as Super PI is single-threaded. Its popularity stemmed from being able to utilize 100% of a multi-core processor's computing time enabling its use as a multi-threaded benchmark application in competitions, computing reviews, and marketing campaigns.

Criticism 
The use of Newton's method for testing stability is inherently unreliable due to the self-correcting nature of the algorithm with subsequent iterations correcting any potential errors. WPrime would theoretically only detect instability from several consecutive errors. Additionally some have argued that the multi-threading algorithm used is not indicative of real world performance though much of this was due to poor implementations of multi-threading in consumer applications the early days of multi-core processors.

References

External links 

Utility software